Antonia Coello Novello, M.D., (born August 23, 1944) is a Puerto Rican physician and public health administrator. She was a vice admiral in the Public Health Service Commissioned Corps and served as 14th Surgeon General of the United States from 1990 to 1993. Novello was the first woman and first Hispanic to serve as Surgeon General. Novello also served as Commissioner of Health for the State of New York from 1999 to 2006. Novello has received numerous awards including more than fifty honorary degrees, was elected to the National Academy of Medicine in 2000, and has been inducted into the National Women's Hall of Fame.

Career

Pediatric nephrologist 
In 1976, Novello opened her own private practice in Springfield, Virginia, where she worked as a pediatrician. However, she soon realized that she lacked adequate emotional detachment for her work so she terminated her practice. Novello stated in an interview, "When the pediatrician cries as much as the parents do, then you know it's time to get out."

Public Health Service
In 1979, Novello joined the Public Health Service and received a commission in the Public Health Service Commissioned Corps (PHSCC). Her first assignment was as a project officer at the National Institute of Arthritis, Metabolism and Digestive Diseases of the National Institutes of Health (NIH). From 1976, she also held a clinical appointment in pediatrics at Georgetown University School of Medicine. During her years at NIH, Novello worked on an MPH degree from the Johns Hopkins School of Hygiene and Public Health, receiving the degree in 1982.

Novello held various positions at NIH before being appointed to Assistant Surgeon General grade in the PHSCC and assignment as the deputy director of the National Institute of Child Health and Human Development (NICHD) in 1986. She also served as Coordinator for AIDS Research for NICHD from September 1987. In this role, she developed a particular interest in pediatric AIDS, which caught the attention of the White House.

Novello made major contributions to the drafting and enactment of the Organ Transplantation Procurement Act of 1984 while assigned to the United States Senate Committee on Labor and Human Resources, working with the staff of committee chairman Orrin Hatch.

Surgeon General
Novello was appointed Surgeon General by President George H. W. Bush, beginning her tenure on March 9, 1990, and was appointed to the temporary rank of vice admiral in the regular corps while the Surgeon General. She was the first woman and the first Hispanic to hold the position.

During her tenure as Surgeon General, Novello focused her attention on the health of women, children and minorities, as well as on underage drinking, smoking, and AIDS. She played an important role in launching the Healthy Children Ready to Learn Initiative. She was actively involved in working with other organizations to promote immunization of children and childhood injury prevention efforts. She spoke out often and forcefully about illegal underage drinking, and called upon the United States Department of Health and Human Services Inspector General to issue a series of eight reports on the subject.

Novello also worked to discourage illegal tobacco use by young people, and repeatedly criticized the tobacco industry for appealing to the youth market through the use of cartoon characters such as Joe Camel. A workshop that she convened led to the emergence of a National Hispanic/Latino Health Initiative.

Novello was controversial among abortion rights advocates due to her support of a policy prohibiting family planning program workers who received federal financing from discussing abortion with their patients.

Novello left the post of Surgeon General on June 30, 1993, with the administration of President Bill Clinton praising her for her "vigor and talent."

Later years
After leaving the position of Surgeon General, Novello remained in the regular corps of the Public Health Service. She was assigned to the United Nations Children's Fund (UNICEF) as Special Representative for Health and Nutrition from 1993 to 1996 reverting to her permanent two-star rank of rear admiral. In 1996, she became visiting professor of health policy and management at the Johns Hopkins School of Hygiene and Public Health. She retired from the Public Health Service and the PHSCC shortly after with the grade of vice admiral.

In 1999, Governor of New York George Pataki appointed Novello as the Commissioner of Health for the State of New York. She served until 2006.

From 2008 to 2014, Novello was vice president of Women and Children Health and Policy Affairs at Disney Children's Hospital at Florida Hospital in Orlando, Florida.

As of December 31, 2014, Novello retired from her position as an executive director of public health policy at Florida Hospital - Orlando.

Awards
  Public Health Service Meritorious Service Medal
  Meritorious Service Medal
  Surgeon General's Exemplary Service Medal
  Public Health Service Distinguished Service Medal
  Public Health Service Outstanding Service Medal
  Public Health Service Commendation Medal
  Public Health Service Citation Medal 
  Public Health Service Outstanding Unit Citation
  Public Health Service Unit Commendation 
  Public Health Service National Emergency Preparedness Award
  Humanitarian Service Medal
  Public Health Service Foreign Duty Service Award
  Public Health Service Regular Corps Ribbon
  Commissioned Officers Association
  Association of Military Surgeons of the United States 
  Reserve Officers Association
 Surgeon General Badge
 Office of the Secretary of Health and Human Services Badge

In 1994, Novello was inducted into the National Women's Hall of Fame. In 2000, she was elected to the National Academy of Medicine.

Early life
Antonia Novello, born on August 23, 1944, in Fajardo, Puerto Rico, was the oldest of three children. Growing up, she was raised primarily by her mother, Ana Delia Flores because her father died when she was four years old. At birth, Novello was diagnosed with Congenital megacolon, a painful condition that required Novello to make frequent trips to the hospital. Although Novello was told at eight years old that she should have surgery to correct her problem, it would take another 10 years before such an operation would happen. Nevertheless, Novello managed to excel in her study to become a doctor. Her experience with that disease, left such an impact on her that she vowed to become a doctor so that "no other person is going to wait 18 years for surgery."

Education 
At an early age, Novello's mother, a school teacher and later high school principal, stressed the importance of an education. Novello excelled in her education and graduated from high school at the age of 15. She attended the University of Puerto Rico in Rio Piedras where she received her Bachelor of Science degree in 1965. She went on to the University of Puerto Rico School of Medicine in San Juan   where she received her Doctor of Medicine degree in 1970. That same year, she married Joseph R. Novello and they both moved to Ann Arbor, Michigan where she continued her medical studies. Novello began a pediatric internship at University of Michigan Medical School. She became the first woman to receive the "University of Michigan Pediatrics Department Intern of the Year" award. In 1973, Novello and her husband moved to Washington D.C. to begin her residency in pediatric nephrology at Georgetown University School of Medicine Hospital until 1976. She also went to Johns Hopkins University.

Marriage 
Novello was married to former US Navy flight surgeon and psychiatrist, Joseph R. Novello.  She was the sister-in-law of Saturday Night Live alumnus Don Novello, creator of the character persona Father Guido Sarducci.

Felony conviction - Now Sealed

In response to a complaint by a former New York State Department of Health employee that Novello used her departmental staff for personal purposes unrelated to her official duties, the New York State Inspector General launched an investigation and in January 2009 produced a report stating that while serving as Health Commissioner, she had routinely abused her authority over department personnel, "turn[ing] her staff at the Health Department into her personal chauffeurs, porters and shopping assistants during her seven-year tenure," and referred a criminal case against her to Albany County District Attorney David Soares. On May 11, 2009, Novello was charged with one count of defrauding the government, three counts of filing a false instrument, and 16 counts of theft of government services. At her arraignment by Judge Stephen Herrick, and represented by attorney E. Stewart Jones, she pleaded not guilty to all charges, but on June 26, 2009, in a plea deal with prosecutors, she pleaded guilty to one felony count of filing a false instrument involving a worker's duties in exchange for a light sentence and dropping the other charges. Her guilty plea was accepted by the court on August 13, 2009.

She was sentenced to pay $22,500 in restitution, a $5,000 fine, and spend 250 hours doing community service at a medical clinic for uninsured patients. Outside the court immediately after the sentencing, Novello called herself a victim of former co-workers and her lawyer called the crime an "administrative processing offense – nothing else." On March 31, 2022, by order of the Albany County Court, Judge Roger D. McDonough, the records were sealed.

See also

List of Puerto Ricans
Puerto Rican scientists and inventors
History of women in Puerto Rico

References

External links

1944 births
20th-century American women scientists
21st-century women scientists
American people convicted of misusing public funds
American politicians of Puerto Rican descent
Commissioners of Health of the State of New York
Hispanic and Latino American politicians
Hispanic and Latino American women in politics
Johns Hopkins Bloomberg School of Public Health alumni
Living people
New York (state) politicians convicted of crimes
New York (state) Republicans
People from Fajardo, Puerto Rico
Puerto Rican people in New York (state) politics
Puerto Rican public health doctors
Recipients of the Humanitarian Service Medal
Recipients of the Meritorious Service Medal (United States)
Recipients of the Public Health Service Distinguished Service Medal
Republican Party (Puerto Rico) politicians
Surgeons General of the United States
University of Puerto Rico alumni
University of Puerto Rico School of Medicine alumni
United States Public Health Service Commissioned Corps admirals
United States Public Health Service Commissioned Corps officers
United States Public Health Service personnel
Women in New York (state) politics
Members of the National Academy of Medicine